Robert Laing may refer to:

 Robert W. Laing, British production designer, art director and set decorator
 Robert Laing (badminton) (born 1999), Scottish para badminton player